Mary was launched at Liverpool in 1806. She made one voyage as a slave ship in the triangular trade in enslaved people. During this voyage she engaged in a notable combat action at night with two British warships. After the British slave trade ended, she traded with Haiti and Brazil, and possibly made one voyage to India under license from the British East India Company (EIC). She then became a whaler and was lost in 1825 in the Pacific on the second of two whaling voyages.

Career
Mary entered Lloyd's Register for 1806 with H. Crow, master, Aspinal, owner, and trade London–Africa.

Enslaving voyage
Captain Hugh Crow (or Crowe), acquired a letter of marque on 15 May 1806. Crow sailed from Liverpool on 9 June 1806. Mary gathered her captives at Bonny and sailed from Africa on 20 October. She then stopped in at São Tomé.

On 30 November there occurred an unfortunate incident. The vessel turned out to be Mary. Crow had thought that the two vessels chasing him in the dark were French privateers out of Cayenne and was determined not to surrender his vessel without a fight. Commander Spear gave him a letter of praise for his determined resistance and the fight became something of a sensation; on his return home Crow received honour, glory, and a substantial reward for his gallantry. Also, "many of the wretched negroes were killed or injured."

Although many captains, fearful of revolt, were chary of arming any of their captives, Crow had trained several of his captives in small arms, passing powder, and other small duties. For their services they each received light trousers, a shirt, and a cap. These men may have been among the casualties in the action with the British warships.

Mary arrived at Kingston, Jamaica, on 12 December. She disembarked 393 captives, some of them wounded from the encounter with Dart and Wolverine. She left on 22 March 1807, and arrived back in England on 2 May. She had left with 56 crew men and had suffered four deaths on the overall voyage.

Merchantman
Lloyd's Register for 1807 showed Marys master changing from Crow to J.M'Neal, her owner from Aspinal to Lees, and her trade from Liverpool–Africa to Liverpool–. In 1808 all changed again. Her new master was Bennil, her owner Robinson, and her trade London–.

Whaler
By 1821 Marys owners were Daniel Bennett & Co and John Lydekker (or Liddereid), her master was E. Reed, and her trade was London–Southern Fishery.

Captain Edward Reed sailed from England on 23 March 1821. Mary was reported to have been at the Cape of Good Hope and the Brazil Banks. She was reported to have been at "Woolwich Bay" (Walvis Bay) on  27 July with 28 tons of whale oil. She was reported to have been on the Brazil Banks on 7 May 1822 with 150 tons of whale oil and five tons of sperm oil.  She returned to England on 11 January 1823 with 250 casks of oil (150 tuns whale oil and 5 tuns sperm oil), plus bone (baleen).

Captain Reed sailed from England on 1 May 1823, bound for the Sandwich Islands.  Mary was at Honolulu between 18 and 29 February 1824 after having spent 10 months in the Marquesas. Carried Doctor Taylor. She returned to Honolulu on 7 March, and again on 6 November. The crew was suffering from scurvy but Mary had gathered 1600 barrels of whale oil.

During the voyage three crewmen were lost when a storm destroyed a whaleboat. Also, a number of crewmen absconded when she called at ports.

Loss
Lloyd's List reported on 4 November 1825 that Mary, Reed, master, was lost on Jarvis's Island. 

Mary had wrecked on Jarvis Island on 20 January 1825. She had grounded during the night on a landform not on their charts. The crew took to the boats and waited near Mary for dawn. In the morning the crew discovered they she was on a sandbank, not a reef. Mary had lost her masts, she was half full of water, and her back was broken. The crew salvaged what they could, though the cargo of 1800 barrels of oil was lost. They stayed on the island for six weeks. They were fortunate that it was the rainy season; they were able to save rain water in casks salvaged from the wreck. They also slept in casks, which protected them from the rains.

Marys crew were in the process of creating a barge out of the wreckage when fortuitously the whalers , Captain Beacon, and Francis, Captain Thomas Hunt, arrived. Both were also Bennett whalers and each took part of the crew. Vansittart arrived at Sydney in July with 16 crew members from Mary, including the second officer. Francis was not expected to call at Sydney. She returned to London in November. Reed went on to captain the whaler .

Notes

Citations

References
 
 
 
 
 
 

1806 ships
Liverpool slave ships
Friendly fire incidents
Age of Sail merchant ships of England
Whaling ships
Maritime incidents in 1825